Multicloud (also spelled multi-cloud or multi cloud) is a company's use of multiple cloud computing and storage services from different vendors in a single heterogeneous architecture to improve cloud infrastructure capabilities and cost. It also refers to the distribution of cloud assets, software, applications, etc. across several cloud-hosting environments. With a typical multicloud architecture utilizing two or more public clouds as well as multiple private clouds, a multicloud environment aims to eliminate the reliance on any single cloud provider and thus, vendor lock-in. 

For example, an enterprise may concurrently use separate cloud providers for infrastructure (IaaS), platform (PaaS) and software (SaaS) services, or use multiple infrastructure (IaaS) or platform (PaaS) providers. In the latter case, they may use different infrastructure providers for different workloads, deploy a single workload load balanced across multiple providers (active-active), or deploy a single workload on one provider, with a backup on another (active-passive).

Advantages and challenges
There are several advantages to using a multicloud approach, including the ability to negotiate better pricing with cloud providers, the ability to quickly switch to another provider if needed, and the ability to avoid vendor lock-in. Multicloud can also be a good way to hedge against the risks of obsolescence, as it allows you to rely on multiple vendors and open standards, which can prolong the life of your systems.

Additional benefits of the multicloud architecture include adherence to local policies that require certain data to be physically present within the area/country, geographical distribution of processing requests from physically closer cloud unit which in turn reduces latency, and mitigating against disasters.

Various issues and challenges also present themselves in a multicloud environment. Security and governance is more complicated, and more "moving parts" may create resiliency issues.

Difference between multicloud and hybrid cloud 
Multicloud differs from hybrid cloud in that it refers to multiple cloud services from different vendors rather than multiple deployment modes (on-premises hardware, and public and private, cloud hosting).

See also 
 Cloud computing

References

Cloud computing